Local elections in Poland comprise elections to local assemblies and elections of municipality, town and city mayors. Elections are ruled by the Prime Minister and are held together between 3 and 4 months before the end of the five year term of local assemblies. Last local elections took place in the autumn of 2018.

2002 

SLD-UP                        -     6644 (14,19%)

PSL                                   -     4986 (10,65%)

Samoobrona                   -     1530   (3,27%)

LPR                                  -     1065   (2,27%)

PiS                                -       217   (0,46%)

PO                -       213   (0,45%)

PO-PiS                         -         85   (0,18%)

Unia Samorządowa     -           4   (0,01%)

Alternatywa                   -           1   (0,00%)

UPR                              -           0   (0,00%)

Other parties     -   32,088 (68,52%)

Total votes  -    46,833 (100,0%)

2006

Voivodship councils

Source: Najwięcej radnych w skali kraju ma PSL, gazeta.pl

References

 
Elections in Poland